The American College of Psychiatrists is an American association of psychiatrists based in Chicago, Illinois. It operates annual meetings, publishes a newsletter, presents awards and organizes the PRITE exam for psychiatric residents and the PIPE exam for practicing psychiatrists. Membership is decided by current members. It was founded in 1963.

References

External links
Official site

Organizations established in 1963
Mental health organizations in Illinois
Medical associations based in the United States
Medical and health professional associations in Chicago
1963 establishments in Illinois